is a Japanese actress. She has appeared in the musical Bleach.

Musical
 Bleach Jump festa as Rukia Kuchiki
 Rock Musical BLEACH (2005) as Rukia Kuchiki
 Rock Musical BLEACH Saien (2006) as Rukia Kuchiki
 Rock Musical BLEACH The Dark of the Bleeding Moon (2006) as Rukia Kuchiki
 Rock Musical BLEACH Live Bankai Show Code 001 (2007) as Rukia Kuchiki
 Rock Musical BLEACH No Clouds in Blue Heavens (2007) as Rukia Kuchiki
 Rock Musical BLEACH THE ALL (2008) as Rukia Kuchiki
 Rock Musical BLEACH Live Bankai Show Code 002 (2008) as Rukia Kuchiki
 Rock Musical BLEACH Live Bankai Show Code 003 (2010) as Rukia Kuchiki
 Shinsei Rock Musical BLEACH 10th Anniversary Memorial Tour (2011) as Rukia Kuchiki
 Shinsei Rock Musical BLEACH REprise (2012) as Rukia Kuchiki

References 

1980 births
Living people
Japanese actresses